Power is a 1928 American silent comedy film directed by Howard Higgin and starring William Boyd, Alan Hale, Sr., and Jacqueline Logan.

Cast
 William Boyd as Husky
 Alan Hale, Sr. as Hanson
 Jacqueline Logan as Lorraine LaRue
 Clem Beauchamp as The Menace 
 Joan Bennett as a Dame 
 Carole Lombard as Another Dame 
 Pauline Curley as a Dame
 Frank Hagney as Job Foreman (uncredited)
 Monty O'Grady as Minor Role (uncredited)

References

Bibliography
 Wes D. Gehring. Carole Lombard, the Hoosier Tornado. Indiana Historical Society Press, 2003.

External links

1928 films
American silent feature films
1920s English-language films
American black-and-white films
Films directed by Howard Higgin
1928 comedy films
Silent American comedy films
Pathé Exchange films
1920s American films